The Union Area School District is a public school district Union City and Union Township in Erie County, Pennsylvania and Bloomfield Township in Crawford County, Pennsylvania. It features one elementary school (pre-k through 5th grade) and a combined middle school and high school (6th through 12th grade).

References

External links

School districts in Crawford County, Pennsylvania
School districts in Erie County, Pennsylvania